King Yi may refer to:

King Yih of Zhou (周懿王;  9th century BC), seventh sovereign of the Chinese Zhou dynasty
King Yi of Zhou (Xie) (周夷王;  9th century BC), ninth sovereign of the Chinese Zhou dynasty
King Yi of Yan (died 312 BC)